Estermann may refer to:

Alois Estermann (1954–1998), senior officer of the Swiss Guard, murdered in his apartment in the Vatican City
Theodor Estermann (1902–1991), mathematician, working in analytic number theory
Yvette Estermann born as Gavlasova (born 1967), Swiss politician, member of the National Council from the Canton of Lucerne

See also
Osterman
Westermann